Spermacoce prostrata (prostrate false buttonweed) is a species of plants in the Rubiaceae. In the United States, it is widespread in Florida, with a few isolated populations in Alabama and Mississippi. The species is native to Mexico, Central America, the Caribbean (Bahamas, Cuba, Hispaniola, Puerto Rico, Trinidad, Turks & Caicos, the Lesser Antilles, and the Dutch and Venezuelan Antilles. It is also widespread in South America, found in every country except Chile. The species is reportedly naturalized in Hawaii, China (Hainan, Hong Kong), Japan, Taiwan, Sri Lanka, Thailand and Java.

References

External links
US Department of Agriculture Plants Profile
La Selva Florula Digital, Páginas de Especies: Spermacoce prostrata
East Tennessee Wildflowers, Buttonweed 
Gardening Europe 
Encyclopedia of Life
Florida Natives, prostrate falst buttonweed

prostrata
Flora of Mexico
Flora of South America
Plants described in 1775